Charles A. Gray  (1864–1900), was a Major League Baseball pitcher who played in   with the Pittsburgh Alleghenys of the National League.

External links

1864 births
1900 deaths
Major League Baseball pitchers
19th-century baseball players
Baseball players from Indiana
Pittsburgh Alleghenys players
Ottawa (minor league baseball) players